Raghunath Vaman Dighe (Marathi: रघुनाथ वामन दिघे) (23 March  1896 - 4 July 1980) was a Marathi writer from Bombay Presidency, India (some of his later works where created when the area was known as Bombay State or after the state was divided and the area became Maharashtra). He wrote notable novels pertaining to rural life in Maharashtra.

Dighe started his professional career as a lawyer in Pune, but later moved to the nearby small town of Khopoli and switched to full-time writing.

Works

Novels
 Pankala (पाणकळा) (1939)
 Sarai (सराई) (1943)
 Poortata (पूर्तता) (1944)
 Nisargakanya Ranjai (निसर्गकन्या रानजाई) (1946)
 Ganlubdha Mruganayana (गानलुब्धा मृगनयना) (1947)
 Pad Re Panya (पड रे पाण्या) (1948)
 Aai Ahe Shetat (आई आहे शेतात)
 Kartiki (कार्तिकी)
 Sonaki (सोनकी)
 Ramya Ratri (रम्य रात्री)

A 1974 movie Kartiki (कार्तिकी) was made as based on the novel with the same name.

Dighe was a script writer of the movie Madhosh.

Play
 Majha Sabud (माझा सबुद)

Collection of poems
 Gatat Nachtat Dharatichi Lekare (गातात नाचतात धरतीची लेकरे)

References
https://books.google.com/books?id=zB4n3MVozbUC&pg=PA1044&lpg=PA1044&dq=R+V+dighe&source=web&ots=OA-V-_WmYX&sig=NHg8hYwIemRv6ZuAh49--xwiBms

1896 births
1980 deaths
Marathi people
Indian male novelists
Marathi-language writers
Marathi novelists
20th-century Indian novelists
Novelists from Maharashtra
20th-century Indian male writers